The 2017 IAAF World Relays is the third edition of the biennial, global track and field relay competition between nations. It was held April 22–23, 2017, in Nassau, Bahamas.

The distance medley relay, an innovation at the 2015 World Relays, was dropped from this year's schedule. A mixed-gendered 4 × 400 m relay race was introduced.

Schedule

Results

Men

Women

Mixed

Medal table

Team standings
Teams scored for every place in the top 8 with 8 points awarded for the first place, 7 for second, etc. The overall points winner was given the Golden Baton.

Participating nations
509 athletes from 35 nations are set to take part in the competition.

 (host)

References

External links
Official site

 
World Athletics Relays
World Relays
International athletics competitions hosted by the Bahamas
World Relays
April 2017 sports events in North America